Arthur Thomas Hatto (11 February 1910 – 6 January 2010) was an English scholar of German studies at the University of London, notable for translations of the Medieval German narrative poems Tristan by Gottfried von Strassburg, Parzival by Wolfram von Eschenbach, and the Nibelungenlied. He was also known for his theory of epic heroic poetry, and related publications. He retired in 1977, and in 1991 the British Academy elected him as a Senior Fellow.

Early life and education
Hatto was born in London on 11 February 1910. His father was Thomas Hatto, a solicitor's clerk who later became the Assistant Chief Solicitor in the British Transport Commission legal service, and his mother Alice Hatto (née Waters), a nurse. The family lived in Forest Hill, and later Clapham. As an eight-year-old boy at the end of the First World War, Hatto spent a formative summer "running wild", as he put it, with an aunt in the "still semi-pagan" village of Barcombe; Hatto's interest in the community and its surroundings, a rural landscape far removed from his London roots as the son of a solicitor's clerk, foreshadowed his interest in the intricacies of human society.

In 1923 Hatto was awarded a scholarship to Dulwich College. He entered on the "modern" side and studied German, Latin, and French, among other subjects, with middling results. He met more success at King's College London, where his father, refusing to see his son "loll on a Sixth Form bench", sent him in 1927. Hatto studied there with Robert Priebsch, Frederick Norman, and Henry Gibson Atkins. Norman, who had such an influence on Hatto that he forever after referred to Norman as "my tutor", recognised Hatto's potential in academia. He refused to take back Hatto's books at the end of term, stating "No, not yours, Mr Hatto, you will be needing them in years to come!"

In an effort to improve his German Hatto left in 1932 for the University of Bern, where, through John Rupert Firth's earlier instruction, he became a Lektor for English. Hatto also studied under Helmut de Boor and Fritz Strich. 

In 1934 King's College awarded Hatto a London MA with distinction for his thesis, "A Middle German Apocalypse Edited from the Manuscript British Museum, Add. 15243". Hatto argued that the manuscript had been written in southwestern Thuringia between 1350 and 1370, and that it was related to the early-15th-century MS Meiningen 57. That same year he returned to King's College, having picked up the local dialect Bärndütsch, and bringing back with him Rose Margot Feibelmann, a medical student from Düsseldorf whom he married in 1935. As she was Jewish, the move probably saved her life and the lives of her parents, who followed in March 1939.

Hatto returned to London, settling first in Radlett and later in Mill Hill, and took up an assistant lectureship in German at King's College. After four years the position was no longer needed and Norman, a mentor to Hatto, recommended him for a new lectureship at Queen Mary College, London. Hatto was chosen over many other applicants, in part, he thought, because the Principal, Sir Frederick Barton Maurice, admired his skill at rugby. 

In 1938 Hatto became the Head of the Department of German, a position he held until his retirement in 1977.

Second World War
Hatto's appointment at Queen Mary College had barely begun when, in February 1939, he was recruited, on the recommendations of Maurice and Norman, to work in the cryptographic bureau in Room 40 at the Foreign Office. Norman was working there also, and on 3 September the two were sent to Bletchley Park, where they worked under John Tiltman. At least two other professors of German, Walter Bruford and Leonard Ashley Willoughby, had served in cryptography during the First World War, and many more served during the Second World War.  As a "nursery for Germanists", Bletchley Park included in its ranks Bruford, Leonard Forster, Kenneth Brooke, Trevor Jones, C. T. Carr, D. M. Mennie, R. V. Tymms, Dorothy Reich, William Rose, K. C. King, F. P. Pickering, and H. B. Willson.

Hatto was well-suited to the task of cryptography, given his philological background and his fluent German. At Bletchley Park he scrutinised ciphers to look for hints of future ciphers. One of his successes was discovering three-letter call signs in the preamble to messages that served as the key to communications between the land, sea and air arms of the Third Reich's combined armed forces, the Wehrmacht, thereby aiding the Allied forces before the Allied invasion of Sicily. 

After Germany fell part of Hatto's section was dispatched to Tokyo, by way of Ceylon. Hatto was invited along by Denys Page but declined, somewhat reluctantly, for his daughter, Jane, had just been born.

Hatto kept silent about his wartime work, even after the work done at Bletchley Park was revealed in F. W. Winterbotham's book The Ultra Secret, published in 1974. Though he was not named in the book, he was nevertheless alarmed by it. According to one of his colleagues, its publication led him to fear being kidnapped by the Soviets to the Lubyanka, "so far removed from the Reading Room of the British Museum".

Postwar career
Wartime duties kept Hatto busy until 1945, although from 1944 onwards he was allowed to lecture in Medieval German at University College London one day a week. He returned to Queen Mary College in 1945, to find the school struggling with its finances and enrolment. As the war became more distant, however, he developed a strong German Department. He started with just himself and a part-time colleague, but by the time he retired the Department had five full-time staff and one and a half language assistants. In 1946 the University of London made him a Reader in German and in 1953 he was promoted to Professor.

Though much of his work was addressed to an academic readership, Hatto's best-known works are translations of three Medieval German poems: Tristan by Gottfried von Strassburg, Parzival by Wolfram von Eschenbach, and the Nibelungenlied. These were three of what Hatto saw as the four great German narrative poems of the age (the fourth, Willehalm, was translated by one of his pupils).

Following the translation of Tristan, published as a Penguin Classic in 1960, Hatto received an invitation from a professor of German at the University of Auckland to visit for several months in 1965. The ensuing trip around the world took Hatto to Istanbul, Delhi, Kathmandu, Bangkok, Auckland, Wellington, Fiji, Hawaii, California, the Grand Canyon, and New York, where he acquired a Kirghiz‐Russian dictionary.

Hatto retired in 1977, by which time he had had at least 72 works published.

Personal life
Hatto and his wife Margot had a daughter, Jane, and a son-in-law, Peter. They remained married until her death in 2000.

Hatto himself died of bronchopneumonia shortly before turning 100, on 6 January 2010, at Field House in Harpenden.

Publications 
For a list of publications through 1977, see ; for some subsequent publications, see .

 
  
 Correction published in  
  
  
  
  
  
  
  
  
  
  
  
  
  
  

Reviews

Notes

References

Bibliography
  
  
  
  
  
  
 Also published online
  

Academics of the University of London
Germanists
1910 births
2010 deaths